Tuticanus is a genus of South American wandering spiders first described by Eugène Simon in 1897.  it contains only two species: T. cruciatus and T. major.

References

Araneomorphae genera
Ctenidae
Spiders of South America
Taxa named by Eugène Simon